are kana suffixes following kanji stems in Japanese written words. They serve two purposes: to inflect adjectives and verbs, and to force a particular kanji to have a specific meaning and be read a certain way. For example, the plain verb form  (miru, "see") inflects to past tense  (mita, "saw"), where  is the kanji stem, and る and た are okurigana, written in hiragana script. With very few exceptions, okurigana are only used for kun'yomi (native Japanese readings), not for on'yomi (Chinese readings), as Chinese morphemes do not inflect in Japanese, and their pronunciation is inferred from context, since many are used as parts of compound words (kango).

The technique in which native scripts are used to inflect adjectives or verbs was first used by Korean scribes in the form of gugyeol, and later spread to Japan. When used to inflect an adjective or verb, okurigana can indicate aspect (perfective versus imperfective), affirmative or negative meaning, or grammatical politeness, among many other functions. In modern usage, okurigana are almost invariably written with hiragana; katakana were also commonly used in the past.

English analogues 
Analogous orthographic conventions find occasional use in English, which, being more familiar, help in understanding okurigana.

As an inflection example, when writing Xing for cross-ing, as in Ped Xing (pedestrian crossing), the -ing is a verb suffix, while cross is the dictionary form of the verb – in this case cross is the reading of the character X, while -ing is analogous to okurigana. By contrast, in the noun Xmas for Christmas, the character Χ is instead read as Christ (it is actually a chi in origin, from the Greek Χριστός, Khristós).  The suffixes serve as phonetic complements to indicate which reading to use.

Another common example is in ordinal and cardinal numbers – "1" is read as one, while "1st" is read as fir-st.

Note that word, morpheme (constituent part of word), and reading may be distinct: in "1", "one" is at once the word, the morpheme, and the reading, while in "1st", the word and the morpheme are "first", while the reading is fir, as the -st is written separately, and in "Xmas" the word is "Christmas" while the morphemes are Christ and -mas, and the reading "Christ" coincides with the first morpheme.

Inflection examples

Adjectives in Japanese use okurigana to indicate aspect and affirmation-negation, with all adjectives using the same pattern of suffixes for each case.  A simple example uses the character  (high) to express the four basic cases of a Japanese adjective.  The root meaning of the word is expressed via the kanji (read taka and meaning "high" in each of these cases), but crucial information (aspect and negation) can only be understood by reading the okurigana following the kanji stem.

  (takai)  High (positive, imperfective), meaning "[It is] expensive" or "[It is] high"
  (takakunai)  High (negative, imperfective), meaning "[It is] not expensive/high"
  (takakatta)  High (positive, perfective), meaning "[It was] expensive/high"
  (takakunakatta)  High (negative, perfective), meaning "[It was not] expensive/high"

Japanese verbs follow a similar pattern; the root meaning is generally expressed by using one or more kanji at the start of the word, with aspect, negation, grammatical politeness, and other language features expressed by following okurigana.

  (taberu)  Eat (positive, imperfective, direct politeness), meaning "[I/you/etc.] eat"
  (tabenai)  Eat (negative, imperfective, direct), meaning "[I/you/etc.] do not eat"
  (tabeta)  Eat (positive, perfective, direct), meaning "[I/you/etc.] ate/have eaten"
  (tabenakatta)  Eat (negative, perfective, direct), meaning "[I/you/etc.] did not eat/have not eaten"

Compare the direct polite verb forms to their distant forms, which follow a similar pattern, but whose meaning indicates more distance between the speaker and the listener:

  (tabemasu)  Eat (positive, imperfective, distant politeness), meaning "[My group/your group] eats"
  (tabemasen)  Eat (negative, imperfective, distant), meaning "[My group/your group] does not eat"
  (tabemashita)  Eat (positive, perfective, distant), meaning "[My group/your group] ate/has eaten"
  (tabemasen deshita)  Eat (negative, perfective, distant), meaning "[My group/your group] did not eat/has not eaten"

Disambiguation of kanji 
Okurigana are also used as phonetic complements to disambiguate kanji that have multiple readings, and consequently multiple meanings. Since kanji, especially the most common ones, can be used for words with many (usually similar) meanings — but different pronunciations — key okurigana placed after the kanji help the reader to know which meaning and reading were intended. Both individual kanji and multi-kanji words may have multiple readings, and okurigana are used in both cases.

Note the okurigana are not considered part of the reading; grammatically the verb is kudasa-ru (verb stem + inflectional suffix), but orthographically the stem itself is analyzed as kuda-sa (kanji reading + okurigana). Compare with furigana, which specify the reading of the kanji, appear outside the line of the text, and which are omitted if understood.

Observe that many Japanese verbs come in transitive/intransitive pairs, as illustrated above, and that a single kanji reading is shared between the two verbs, with sufficient okurigana written to reflect changed endings.

Another example includes a common verb with different meanings based on the okurigana:
  (hana-su)  "to speak/to talk". Example:  (chanto hanasu hō ga ii), meaning "It's better if you speak correctly."
  (hana-shi)  noun form of the verb hanasu, "to speak".  Example:  (hanashi kotoba to kaki kotoba), meaning "spoken words and written words".
  (hanashi)  noun, meaning "a story" or "a talk". Example:  (hanashi wa ikaga?), meaning "How about a story?"

Okurigana are not always sufficient to specify the reading. In such cases the reading must be deduced from context or via furigana.

Ambiguity may be introduced in inflection – even if okurigana specify the reading in the base (dictionary) form of a verb, the inflected form may obscure it. For example,  i-ku "go" and  okona-u "perform, carry out" are distinct in dictionary form, but in past ("perfective") form become  i-tta "went" and  okona-tta "performed, carried out" – which reading to use must be deduced from context or furigana.

One of the most complex examples of okurigana is the kanji , pronounced shō or sei in borrowed Chinese vocabulary, which stands for several native Japanese words as well:
  nama 'raw' or ki 'pure/unprocessed'
  o-u 'grow/spring up'
  i-kiru 'live'
  i-kasu 'make use of (experience, skills)'
  i-keru 'arrange (flowers)'
 u-mu 'bear (child)/produce'
  u-mareru/uma-reru 'be born'
  ha-eru 'grow' (intransitive)
  ha-yasu 'grow' (transitive)
as well as the hybrid Chinese-Japanese words
  shō-jiru 'occur', which is a modification of
  shō-zuru (single character +  (rendaku of する))
Note that some of these verbs share a kanji reading (i, u, and ha), and okurigana are conventionally picked to maximize these sharings.

Multi-character words 
Okurigana may also be used in multi-kanji words, where the okurigana specifies the pronunciation of the entire word, not simply the character that they follow; these distinguish multi-kanji native words from kango (borrowed Chinese words) with the same characters. Examples include nouns such as  kikubari "care, consideration" versus  kehai "indication, hint, sign" (note that the reading of  changes between ki and ke, despite it not having an okurigana of its own), and verbs, such as  hayaru "be popular, be fashionable", versus  ryūkō "fashion". Note that in this later case, the native verb and the borrowed Chinese word with the same kanji have approximately the same meaning, but are pronounced differently.

Okurigana can also occur in the middle of a compound, such as  ochiba "fallen leaves" and  rakuyō "fallen leaves, defoliation" – note that the reading of the terminal  changes between ba and yō despite it occurring after the okurigana.

Historical suffixes 

For a few categories of words, okurigana correspond to historical suffixes which are no longer distinct or productive, and the suffix is now fused to the word, but still written in hiragana. This is particularly the case for words which function as adjectives, with notable categories including:
 -shii adjectives, such as  ure-shii "happy"
 -yaka na adjectives, such as  nigi-yaka(na) "bustling, busy"
 -raka na adjectives, such as  aki-raka(na) "clear, obvious"
 -taru adjectives, such as  dōdō-taru "magnificent, stately"
 -naru adjectives, such as  tan-naru "mere, simple"
Note that only the -i in -shii inflects; the other kana are invariant, and in practice serve only for disambiguation and to reflect historical grammar. Briefly, -shii adjectives used to be a different class from -i adjectives (distinguished historically as -ku and -shiku adjectives, for present -i and -shii), but have since merged; -yaka and -raka used to be suffixes, but are no longer productive, while -taru and -naru are historical variants of what is now the adjective particle -na. See Japanese adjectives for details.

Informal rules

Verbs

The okurigana for group I verbs ( godan dōshi, also known as u-verbs) usually begin with the final mora of the dictionary form of the verb.
 no-mu to drink,  itada-ku to receive,  yashina-u to cultivate,  ne-ru to twist

For group II verbs ( ichidan dōshi, also known as ru-verbs) the okurigana begin at the mora preceding the last, unless the word is only two morae long.
 samata-geru to prevent,  ta-beru to eat,  shi-meru to comprise,  ne-ru to sleep,  ki-ru to wear

If the verb has different variations, such as transitive and intransitive forms, then the different morae are written in kana, while the common part constitutes a single common kanji reading for all related words.

In other cases (different verbs with similar meanings, but which are not strictly variants of each other), the kanji will have different readings, and the okurigana thus also indicate which reading to use.
 obiya-kasu to threaten (mentally),  odo-su to threaten (physically)

Adjectives

Most adjectives ending in -i (true adjectives) have okurigana starting from the -i.
 yasu-i,  taka-i,  aka-i

Okurigana starts from shi for adjectives ending in -shii (this reflects historical grammar; see above).
 tano-shii,  ichijiru-shii,  mazu-shii

Exceptions occur when the adjective also has a related verbal form. In this case, as with related verbs (above), the reading of the character is kept constant, and the okurigana are exactly the morae that differ.
 atata-meru (verb),  atata-kai (adjective) – in both cases  is read atata.
 tano-mu (verb),  tano-moshii (adjective) – in both cases  is read tano.

As with verbs, okurigana is also used to distinguish between readings (unrelated adjectives with the same kanji), in which case the okurigana indicate which reading to use.
 hoso-i,  koma-kai;  ō-ini,  ō-kii

Na-adjectives (adjectival verbs) that end in -ka have okurigana from the ka.
 shizu-ka,  tashi-ka,  yuta-ka,  oro-ka

Adverbs

The last mora of an adverb is usually written as okurigana.
 sude-ni,  kanara-zu,  suko-shi
Note that such adverbs are often written in kana, such as  matta-ku  and  moppa-ra .

Nouns 
Nouns do not normally have okurigana.
  tsuki,  sakana,  kome
In some cases the reading is then ambiguous, and must be deduced from context or by furigana.
  nama or ki
  tetsu or kurogane (tetsu is usual)

However, if the noun is derived from a verb or adjective, it may take the same okurigana, although some may be omitted in certain cases (see below). The derivation may not be apparent if it is old and the verb is no longer in use (see below).
  a-tari (from  a-taru),  ika-ri (from  ika-ru),  tsu-ri (from  tsu-ru),  kiza-shi (from  kiza-su)

For some nouns it is obligatory to omit the okurigana, despite having a verbal origin.
  hanashi (from  hana-su),  kōri (from  kō-ru),  tatami (from  tata-mu)

In these cases, the noun form of the corresponding verb does take okurigana.
  hana-shi is the nominal form of the verb  hana-su, and not the noun  hanashi.
Formally, the verbal noun (VN, still retaining verbal characteristics) takes okurigana, as is usual for verbs, while the deverbal noun (DVN, without verbal characteristics) does not take okurigana, as is usual for nouns.

To understand this grammatical distinction, compare the English present participle (verb form ending in -ing, indicating continuous aspect) and the gerund (noun form of the -ing verb form, which is a verbal noun) versus deverbal forms (which are irregular):
"I am learning Japanese" (verb) and "Learning is fun" (verbal noun) versus the deverbal "Alexandria was a center of learning" (here "learning" is being used as synonymous with "knowledge", rather than an activity)

Similarly, some nouns are derived from verbs, but written with different kanji, in which case no okurigana are used.
  hori moat, from  hori (nominal form of  horu to dig)
In other cases a kanji may be derived from another verb or verb combination and retain the okurigana:
  shiawa-se from  shi-awa-se

Some okurigana come from Old Japanese, and the underlying verb is no longer in use.
  saiwa-i from earlier saihahi
  ikio-i from  ikio-fu (compare  sei)
Note that these -i suffixes are not i-adjectives – they are the ends of verb stems.

Compounds

In compounds, okurigana may be omitted if there is no ambiguity in meaning or reading – in other words, if that compound is only read a single way. If okurigana occur after several characters (esp. both in the middle of the compound and at the end of the compound, as in 2-character compounds), either only the middle okurigana, or both the middle and the final okurigana may be omitted; omitting only the final okurigana but retaining the middle okurigana is rather unusual and somewhat questionable, though not unknown (marked with “?” below).
 u-ke tsu-ke,  uke tsu-ke,  ?u-ke tsuke,  uke tsuke
 i-ki saki,  iki saki
This is particularly done for Japanese compound verbs (the okurigana inflection of the first, main verb is dropped), as above. This is especially common in reducing or removing kana in formulaic constructions, particularly in signs.

If the compound is unfamiliar to the reader, there is the risk of it being incorrectly read with on readings, rather than the kun readings – for example,  "drive-in forbidden" is read nori-ire-kin-shi – the first two characters are a compound verb – but an unfamiliar reader may guess jōnyū-kinshi based on the on readings. However, this is not a problem with familiar compounds, whose reading is already known.

Okurigana are avoided in compounds where the reading cannot easily be analyzed into readings of the individual characters, as these are confusing – the reading simply must be learnt separately. These include especially ateji and gikun, as well as cases where a compound word has changed pronunciation over the years, and is no longer a simple combination of the compounds. For example,  i-buki "breath" is specifically prescribed to not have okurigana – there is the related verb  i-bu-ku "to breathe", which must have okurigana for inflection, but  is otherwise pronounced iki, so there is the risk of misreading as *iki-buki. This is formalized for the words in the addendum to the Jōyō list in the second category of exceptions, listed below.

Exceptions
The above rules are guidelines, and there are exceptions and special cases that must be learnt individually: okurigana that has become standard for historical reasons (now obscure or not obvious at a glance) or by convention rather than logic. Compare for instance:
 aka-rui – rather than  akaru-i
 a-kari ( aka-ri also acceptable)
These both originally derived from the verb  aka-ru, which is no longer in use; the first is an irregularly derived i-adjective, while the latter is a deverbal noun. Compare  a-ku and  aki-raka.

Formal rules 
The Japanese Ministry of Education (MEXT) prescribes rules on how to use okurigana, giving standardized Japanese orthography. The original notification (see references) is from 1973, but it was amended in 1981 when the jōyō kanji table was issued.

The rules apply to kun'yomi (native Japanese readings) of kanji in the jōyō kanji table; they do not apply to kanji outside the jōyō kanji table, or kanji without kun'yomi (with only on'yomi, Chinese readings). The notification gives 7 general rules and 2 rules for difficult cases in the jōyō kanji table's word list attachment. The first 2 rules (1 & 2) address words that conjugate, the next 3 rules (3–5) address words that do not conjugate, and the last 2 rules (6 & 7) address compound words. Whenever there's doubt whether something is permissible use or not, the general rule is to be followed. In some cases, variations are permitted, when there is no danger of confusion; in other case, when there is danger of confusion, variations are not permitted.

Scope:
 The notification provides the basis for okurigana usage in laws, official documents, newspapers, magazines, broadcasts, and similar places where modern Japanese is written using the readings given in the jōyō kanji table.
 The notification does not attempt to regulate the use of okurigana in science, technology, art, and other special fields or in writing of individuals.
 The notification does not apply to proper nouns or kanji used as symbols.
 Okurigana is not used for on readings, and they are not mentioned in the rules except where necessary.

Examples for each rule, with permitted variations:
This rule states that one needs to write (at least) the part of the word that changes under inflection – the last mora.
 The 1981 Cabinet notification prescribes the okurigana usage  (for  read as ), but  is also explicitly permitted.
In Japanese, there are many pairs of transitive/intransitive verbs, some of which differ in the last mora, other of which differ in the second to last mora, as in this example.
 The 1981 Cabinet notification prescribes the okurigana usage  (for  read as ), but  is permitted because there's no fear of it being misread.
 The 1981 Cabinet notification prescribes the okurigana usage .
 The 1981 Cabinet notification prescribes the okurigana usage .
 The 1981 Cabinet notification prescribes the okurigana usage .
 The 1981 Cabinet notification prescribes the okurigana usage  (for  read as ), but  is permitted because there's no fear of it being misread.
 The 1981 Cabinet notification prescribes the okurigana usage .
 The 1981 Cabinet notification prescribes the okurigana usage  (for ), but  is permitted because there's no fear of it being misread.
 The 1981 Cabinet notification prescribes the okurigana usage  (iteration mark), but  (no iteration mark if okurigana is present).
 The 1981 Cabinet notification prescribes the okurigana usage .
 The 1981 Cabinet notification prescribes the okurigana usage .
 The 1981 Cabinet notification prescribes the okurigana usage .

Special cases
There are 16 special cases listed, 7 where okurigana is required or recommended, 9 where it is forbidden. These refer to prescribed spellings of words on the attachment to the Jōyō kanji list.

Required or recommended (acceptable alternatives in parentheses):
 
 
 
 
 
 
 

Forbidden:
  i-buki
  sa-jiki
  shigure
  tsuki-yama (avoid confusion with  kizu-ki)
  na-gori (avoid confusion with  noko-ri)
  nadare (avoid confusion with  kuzu-re)
  fubuki
  mai-go (avoid confusion with  mayo-i)
  yuku-e

Issues

Variation 
While MEXT prescribes rules and permitted variations, in practice there is much variation – permitted or not – particularly in older texts (prior to guidelines) and online – note that these rules are not prescriptive for personal writings, but only in official documents and media.

Sound change 
While okurigana are sufficient to show inflection of adjectives and verbs, in rare cases further sound change occurs that affects the stem, and must be inferred from the okurigana, without being explicitly written. This sound change is due to this being a polite adjective form.

If there is additional non-inflectional okurigana, then these are change, and this is sufficient to show the sound change in the spelling. This occurs for adjectives ending in -shii, like , hence .

Confusion with compounds 
There is a risk of confusion of okurigana with compounds: some Japanese words are traditionally written with kanji, but today some of these kanji are hyōgaiji (uncommon characters), and hence are often written as a mixture of kanji and kana, the uncommon characters being replaced by kana; this is known as mazegaki. The resulting orthography is seen by some as confusing and unsightly, particularly if it is the second character that is written in kana – the kana characters are where okurigana would be expected to go – and this is one motivation for expansions of kanji lists.

Unwritten particles 
Converse to okurigana, where part of the pronunciation of a word is written after the kanji, in some cases following kana is dropped (or included in the reading of the previous character). This is primarily for the attributive particles  -no (sometimes written in katakana as ) and  -ga (sometimes written  or ), and is most common in names. For example, the common family name Inoue (I-no-ue Well’s top, top of well) is generally written , though if the particle were written it would be . Similarly, Amagasaki (Ama-ga-saki, Nun’s peak) is generally written , but can be written , and Sen no Rikyū is written  (here the particle is between the family and given name). This can sometimes cause ambiguity, as in the Yamanote Line (for a time called the Yamate Line) and the Agatsuma Line (which could be read as Azuma). Particles are considered grammatically separate from the attached word (they are not an inflection), and this is not considered okurigana, despite some superficial similarities.

Other affixes 
Japanese has various affixes, some of which are written in kana and should not be confused with okurigana.

See also
 Phono-semantic compound characters, the analogous principle in the autochthonous Chinese script

Notes

References

Citations

Sources 

   – 1973 notification, as amended in 1981 (document actually reads Shōwa era 48, as amended in Shōwa 56)

Kana
Japanese writing system